A hamada is a type of desert landscape consisting of high, largely barren, hard rocky plateaus, where most of the sand has been removed by deflation. The majority of the Sahara is in fact hamada.

Formation
Hamadas are produced by the wind removing the fine products of weathering: an aeolian process known as deflation. The finer-grained products are taken away in suspension, while the sand is removed through saltation and surface creep, leaving behind a landscape of gravel, boulders and bare rock.

Related landforms
Hamada is related to desert pavement (known variously as reg, serir, gibber or saï), which occurs as stony plains or depressions covered with gravels or boulders, rather than as highland plateaus.

Hamadas exist in contrast to ergs, which are large areas of shifting sand dunes.

See also
Hammada, a genus of flowering plants belonging to the family Amaranthaceae.

References

Deserts and xeric shrublands
Arabic words and phrases